The King of Snooker (Traditional Chinese: 桌球天王) is a TVB television drama miniseries revolving around the sport of snooker in Hong Kong.  It was originally broadcast by the network in 2009, from 30 March through 24 April, and subsequently re-released on DVD in several translations.

Synopsis
World champion snooker player Yau Yat Kiu (Adam Cheng) takes everyone by surprise when he suddenly retires from the snooker world. This comes as a huge disappointment to his daughter Yau Ka Kan (Niki Chow), who has always wanted to follow in his footsteps. She feels bewildered too, for although Kiu pretends he does not care about the sport any more, he has set up a series of challenge matches on the snooker table in his restaurant. His real purpose is that he is waiting for someone he feels is worth taking on as a protégé. Kiu comes to know Kan Tze Him (Patrick Tang) by chance. Noticing his flair for snooker, Kiu decides to teach Him all he knows about the game. Later, Kan manages to persuade her father into taking her on as a student as well.

Him fancies Kan, but she is fond of Lui Kin Chung (Derek Kok), Kiu's bitter rival. Chung's manager is a devious person; in order to ensure Chung's victory against Kiu, he drugs Kiu's water with sleeping pills during a match. After the game, Chung falls out with his manager because of this when he finds out.

Later in the series, a woman named Chin To To (Joyce Tang) falls in love with Kiu.  Meanwhile, Him falls out with Kiu because of Chung's ex-manager. Both master and disciple come to settle their scores on a snooker table in the end.

Cast

Awards and nominations
TVB Anniversary Awards (2009):
 Best Drama
 Most Improved Actress (Catherine Chau)

Viewership ratings

DVD release
The entire 20-episode miniseries has been re-released as a region-free 4-disc DVD box set in NTSC video format. It features the original Cantonese and a Mandarin Chinese audio track, with English and Malay translation subtitles, and Chinese subtitles for the hearing-impaired.

References

External links
The show's official website at TVB.com 
Screen-captures and synopsis by K for TVB

Notes 
 In 2008, prior to filming, Joyce Cheng, along with Adam Cheng were considered, for they were daughter and father. Ultamitely, the former had schedule conflicts, ultimately causing Nikki Chow to inherit the role of Yau-Ka-Kan.

TVB dramas
Snooker on television
2009 Hong Kong television series debuts
2009 Hong Kong television series endings